Talamanca Cabecar is an indigenous territory in Costa Rica. It is home to the Cabecar people.

References 

Cabécar people
Indigenous territories of Costa Rica